Sankhavaram Mandal is one of the 21 mandals in Kakinada district of Andhra Pradesh. As per census 2011, the mandal comprises one town and 29 villages.

Demographics 
Sankhavaram Mandal has total population of 57,017 as per the Census 2011 out of which 28,575 are males while 28,442 are females and the Average Sex Ratio of Sankhavaram Mandal is 995. The total literacy rate of Sankhavaram Mandal is 59.85%. The male literacy rate is 56.71% and the female literacy rate is 49.78%.

Towns and villages

Towns 

 Arempudi

Villages 

Ammirekhala
Ankampalem
Annavaram
Anumarthi
Atchampeta
Avethi
Dhara Mallapuram
Gondhi	Sankhavaram
Gondhi Kothapalle
Gowrampeta
Jagannadhapuram
Jaggampeta
Kathipudi
Konthangi
Mandapam
Masampalle
Nellipudi
Ondregula
Pedamallapuram
Polavaram
Rajaram
Sankhavaram
Seethayampeta
Siddivaripalem
Srungadhara
Vadrevu Venkatapuram
Vazrakutam
Velangi
Yarakapuram

See also 
List of mandals in Andhra Pradesh

References 

Mandals in Kakinada district
Mandals in Andhra Pradesh